Lingchuan County is a county in the southeast of Shanxi province, China, bordering Henan province to the east and southeast. It is under the administration of Jincheng city.

Climate

References

External links
www.xzqh.org 

County-level divisions of Shanxi